The 1978 St. Louis Cardinals season was the team's 59th year with the National Football League and the 19th season in St. Louis. The controversial recruitment of 62-year-old former Oklahoma Sooners coach Bud Wilkinson was a failure, as the team, already affected by becoming the first opponent team to lose visiting the expansion Tampa Bay Buccaneers (in December 1977), failed to maintain the standard of the previous four seasons. St. Louis lost its first eight games to be out of the running for the playoffs by midseason, and even a sequence of six wins in eight games failed to move them beyond a tie for last in its division.

The last of the Cardinals’ initial eight consecutive losses was the final time they played the New York Jets until 1996, by which time the franchise was based in Phoenix and provided a notorious Jets’ team with the win needed to avoid the first 0–16 record in NFL history. The reason for this is that before the admission of the Texans in 2002, NFL scheduling formulas for games outside a team's division were much more influenced by table position during the previous season.

Wilkinson was hired in early March, following the release of Don Coryell in February. Wilkinson had last coached at Oklahoma in 1963, and had since been an analyst on college football telecasts.

Offseason

NFL Draft

Staff

Roster

Regular season

Schedule

Standings

Awards and records

References

External links
 Cardinals on Pro Football Reference
 Cardinals on jt-sw.com

St. Louis
Arizona Cardinals seasons